The Licks Tour was a worldwide concert tour undertaken by the Rolling Stones during 2002 and 2003, in support of their 40th anniversary compilation album Forty Licks. The tour grossed over $300 million, becoming the second highest grossing tour at that time, behind their own Voodoo Lounge Tour of 1994–1995.

Background
The itinerary continued the Rolling Stones' practice of mixing theatre, arena, and stadium venues. With little new music to promote, set lists were dynamic and featured a total of 80 different songs.

The production was designed by Mark Fisher, Charlie Watts, Mick Jagger, and Patrick Woodroffe. During the song "Honky Tonk Women", an animated video was shown of a topless woman riding the famous Rolling Stones Tongue logo before being devoured.

Planned dates in East Asia and the final date of the tour were cancelled in response to the SARS outbreak of 2002–2003.  Additionally, because Toronto, Ontario, Canada was also affected, the Rolling Stones headlined the Molson Canadian Rocks for Toronto concert on 30 July 2003 to help the city recover from the effects of the epidemic. It was attended by an estimated 490,000 people. Finally, on 7–9 November 2003, the band played its first ever concerts in Hong Kong, as part of the Harbour Fest celebration. The tour was sponsored by E-Trade.

In Chicago, U2 frontman Bono joined the Stones for "It's Only Rock'n Roll (But I Like It)". But after the conclusion of the song, Bono left the stage without acknowledging the audience. Dr. John also guested as well.

In January, American cable network HBO broadcast a concert from Madison Square Garden in New York.

In Sydney, Leipzig, Hockenheim, Oberhausen and Toronto, Angus and Malcolm Young from AC/DC played "Rock Me Baby" with the Rolling Stones. The Leipzig performance can be found on disc 2 of AC/DC's Plug Me In, while the Toronto performance was included in the Toronto Rocks DVD.

Set list 
The setlist for each show depended on what type of venue they were played (Stadium, Arena, or Theatre). 

{{hidden
|headercss = background: #ccccff; font-size: 100%; width: 90%;
|header = Standard Stadium setlist
|content =
"Brown Sugar"
"It's Only Rock and Roll"
"Start Me Up"
"Don't Stop"
"Tumbling Dice"
"Angie"
"You Can't Always Get What you Want"
"Midnight Rambler"
"Monkey Man" 
"Love Train"
"Little Queenie"
"Slipping Away"
"Happy"
"Sympathy for the Devil"
"You Got Me Rocking"
"When the Whip Comes Down"
"Miss You"
"Gimme Shelter"
"Honky Tonk Woman"
"Street Fighting Man"
"Jumpin' Jack Flash"

Encore 
"(I Can't Get No) Satisfaction"
}}

Tour dates

Personnel
The Rolling Stones
Mick Jagger – lead vocals, guitars, harmonica, additional keyboards
Keith Richards – rhythm guitar, backing vocals
Ronnie Wood – lead guitar
Charlie Watts – drums

Additional musicians
Darryl Jones – bass
Chuck Leavell – keyboards, backing vocals;
Bobby Keys – saxophone
Tim Ries – saxophone
Michael Davis – trombone;
Kent Smith – trumpet
Lisa Fischer – backing vocals, 
Bernard Fowler – backing vocals
Blondie Chaplin – backing vocals, additional guitar

See also
 List of The Rolling Stones concert tours
 List of highest grossing concert tours

Notes

References

The Rolling Stones concert tours
2002 concert tours
2003 concert tours